Uday or Udai Singh may refer to:

Udayasimha, Ruler of Jalore during c. 1204 – 1257
Uday Singh (born 1952), an Indian politician
Uday Singh (religious leader), religious leader of Namdhari Sikhs
Uday Singh (Fiji politician) (1938–2014), an Indo-Fijian politician
Uday Singh Taunque (1982–2003), an Indo-American Army soldier
Uday Pratap Singh, an Indian politician
Uday Pratap Singh (Madhya Pradesh politician), an Indian politician for Madhya Pradesh
Raja Uday Pratap Singh (born 1933), an Indian titular Raja of the former princely state Bhadri of Oudh from 1970 to present

See also 
 Udai Singh (disambiguation)